(born 29 March 1940 in Hyōgo Prefecture) is a Japanese swimmer and Olympic medalist. He participated at the 1960 Summer Olympics, winning a silver medal in 4 x 200 metre freestyle relay.

References

External links
 

1940 births
Living people
Sportspeople from Hyōgo Prefecture
Olympic swimmers of Japan
Olympic silver medalists for Japan
Swimmers at the 1960 Summer Olympics
Swimmers at the 1964 Summer Olympics
World record setters in swimming
Japanese male freestyle swimmers
Asian Games medalists in swimming
Swimmers at the 1958 Asian Games
Olympic silver medalists in swimming
Universiade medalists in swimming
Asian Games gold medalists for Japan
Asian Games silver medalists for Japan
Medalists at the 1958 Asian Games
Universiade gold medalists for Japan
Universiade bronze medalists for Japan
Medalists at the 1960 Summer Olympics
Medalists at the 1961 Summer Universiade
Medalists at the 1963 Summer Universiade
20th-century Japanese people